Jason Marshall may refer to:

 Jason Marshall (ice hockey) (born 1971), Canadian retired ice hockey defenceman
 Jason Marshall (rugby union) (born 1989), Canadian rugby union player
 Jason Marshall (baseball), American college baseball coach
 Jason Marshall (cricketer), English cricketer
 Jason Marshall (tennis) (born 1978), American tennis player